One Second is the sixth album released by British metal band Paradise Lost. The album marks the group's transition from a gothic metal act to a more electronic direction. It is the bestselling record of their career and enabled the band to sign with the German branch of major label EMI. One Second is Paradise Lost's first album recorded in digital format.

A 20th Anniversary Edition was released on 14 July 2017, which contained the original album remastered by Jaime Gomez Arellano and an additional disc with audio from a Paradise Lost's concert at Shepherd's Bush Empire on 26 January 1998. The concert was part of the tour in support of the One Second album release. The concert was previously released as part of the Evolve DVD, and is released on CD for the first time.

In 2020, it was named one of the 20 best metal albums of 1997 by Metal Hammer magazine.

Musical style 

About the musical style of One Second, Nick Holmes told Decibel:

Track listing
All tracks by Nick Holmes and Gregor Mackintosh except as indicated.

Metal Mind Productions and Music for Nations reissue

The End Records reissue

Pony Canyon Inc. and Jive Records reissue

20th Anniversary Edition reissue (Music for Nations), second disc, live at Shepherd's Bush Empire, London on 26 January 1998

Credits
Nick Holmes – vocals
Gregor Mackintosh – lead guitar, keyboards
Aaron Aedy – rhythm guitar
Steve Edmondson – bass guitar
Lee Morris – drums, backing vocals

Liner notes
 Recorded at Battery Studios, London, and Rockfield Studios, Monmouth, Wales
 Produced, engineered and mastered by Sank for Toytown Productions
 Mixed by Stefan Glaumann and Sank at MVG Studios
 Additional backing vocals by Greg & Sank
 Additional engineering by Richard Flack
 Sampling, programming and keyboards by Sank and Gregor Mackintosh
 Violin/strings by Stephan Brisland-Ferner
 Arranged by Sank, Stefan and Gregor Mackintosh
 Cover photo concept idea by Ross Halfin
 Band photograph by David Tonge
 Other photography by Susan Andrews for Refocus
 Design and layout by Design Ministry

Charts

Release history

References

External links
 One Second on Discogs

Paradise Lost (band) albums
1997 albums
Albums recorded at Rockfield Studios